Dudua charadraea is a moth of the family Tortricidae first described by Edward Meyrick in 1909. It is found in Thailand, Sri Lanka, Taiwan, western Java and western Sumatra.

References

Moths described in 1909
Olethreutini
Moths of Japan